The 31st of February is a 1950 mystery crime novel by British writer Julian Symons. It was his fourth published novel following a trilogy featuring Chief Inspector Bland. It further continued the author's toying with the Great Detective type of the classic model during the Golden Age of Detective Fiction. The investigating officer in a potential murder case, Inspector Cresse, is far from flattering portrayed.

Synopsis
When the wife of advertising agency executive Anderson is found dead, police suspect murder begin to hound Anderson into admitting his guilt.

References

Bibliography
 Bargainnier, Earl F. Twelve Englishmen of Mystery. Popular Press, 1984.
 Walsdorf, John J. & Allen, Bonnie J. Julian Symons: A Bibliography. Oak Knoll Press, 1996.

1950 British novels
Novels by Julian Symons
British detective novels
British crime novels
British mystery novels
Novels set in London
Victor Gollancz Ltd books